Julian Plenti Is... Skyscraper is the first solo album released by Paul Banks, the lead singer for the band Interpol, under the name Julian Plenti. It was released on August 4, 2009.

The music video for "Games for Days" was directed by Javier Aguilera and features Emily Haines from Metric.

Critical reception

In a First Listen feature on their website, The-Fly.co.uk said that Julian Plenti is... Skyscraper "could almost be two different albums – one with folky, Bon Iver-esque lullabies and one with upbeat art-rock stomps" and that it is a "beautiful little sonic beast". ClashMusic.com reviewed the album, praising its ambition but stating that it sometimes suffered for a lack of simplicity, but added: "That said, it's a collection of eleven songs that will haunt and inspire you at the same time with a bewitching mix of influences and styles." Gigwise.com gave the album 4/5 and described it as "An ambitious attempt to give Banks his individuality back." then going on to say "Interpol may take most of the plaudits in his career but it’s Julian Plenti who reveals the true Paul Banks."

Track listing
All tracks written by Paul Banks.
"Only if You Run" – 3:49
"Fun That We Have" – 3:41
"Skyscraper" – 3:20
"Games for Days" – 3:57
"Madrid Song" – 2:08
"No Chance Survival" – 4:04
"Unwind" – 3:18
"Girl on the Sporting News" – 2:53
"On the Esplanade" – 3:41
"Fly as You Might" – 3:57
"H" – 2:39

"Only if You Run" is featured in the end credits of the Joel Schumacher film Twelve, as well as in the episode "Sabotage" of Stargate Universe. "Skyscraper" is featured in the final scenes of the 2011 American thriller film I Melt with You.

Personnel
Julian Plenti/Paul Banks – Vocals, Guitar, Piano, Drums, Programming, Writer, Producer, Artwork By [Art Direction]
Charles Burst – Drums (Tracks 1, 3, 8), Recorded By
Yoed Nir – Cello (Tracks 3, 5, 8, 9, 10, 11)
Dmitry Ishenko – Bass & Double Bass (Tracks 1, 3, 4, 6, 8, 11), Other [Session Logistics]
Mike Stroud – Guitar Harmony (Track 3)
Jessica Pavone – Violin & Viola (Tracks 1, 3, 5, 8, 10, 11)
Sam Fogarino – Drums (Track 4)
Striker Manley – Drums (Track 6)
Glenn White – Saxophone (Tracks 7, 11)
Alex Weiss – Saxophone (Track 7)
Additional
Peter Katis – Mixed By, Producer [Additional], Music By [Additional], Recorded By [Additional]
Greg Giorgio – Recorded By [Additional]
Mitch Rackin – Recorded By
Mark O – Artwork By [Design]
Jeremy Kirkland – Other [Logic Guru]
Trevort Luikart – Other [Logic Guru]
Matthew Salacuse – Photography
Noah Goldstein – Recorded By [Vocals Tracked]

Chart performance

References

2009 albums
Matador Records albums
Albums produced by Peter Katis
Paul Banks (American musician) albums